Mary Madeiras is an American television soap opera director.

Directing credits

All My Children
 Occasional Director (2003)

Another World
 Associate Director (1991–1999)

Days of Our Lives
 Occasional Director (2001–2003)

General Hospital
 Director (2003)
 Occasional Director (2002)

Passions
 Occasional Director (1999)

Awards and nominations
Daytime Emmy Award
Win, 2004, Directing, General Hospital
Nomination, 1993, Directing, Another World
Win, 1992, Directing, Another World

Directors Guild of America Award
Win, 1993, Directing, Another World

References

External links

American television directors
American women television directors
Living people
Place of birth missing (living people)
Year of birth missing (living people)
Directors Guild of America Award winners
Daytime Emmy Award winners